Thiri Thu Sandar Dewi, commonly known as Limban Mibaya, was a queen of the fourth rank of King Mindon during the Konbaung dynasty.

Life and family
Limban Mibaya was born to Tharbyu (also Minyon), mayor of Kanaung and Myanaung and his second wife Thakhingyi. She was the elder sister of Thetpan Mibaya.

Her father's first wife gave birth to Khin The, and so Limban Mibaya and the Queen of the Northern Palace were half-sisters (shared same father).

When her father died, her mother married an officer of Kyaukpadaung and gave birth to Tharazein Mibaya, Maung Lay Nge, and Maung Thudaw. Thus, Limban Mibaya and Tharazein Mibaya were also half-sisters (shared same mother).

Life in palace
Limban Mibaya became a kollotaw of Prince Mindon, at the age of 16. When King Mindon ascended the throne, she became a fourth-rank queen and received the appanage of Limban.

Limban Mibaya died in 1893, and buried at Wingabar mound of Ngahtatgyi Buddha Temple.

Issues
King Mindon and Limban Mibaya had four sons and a daughter, but second and third sons did not survive– only Salin Supaya, Kyapin Prince and Thiri Thu Dhammaraja Yanaung Prince were alive.

Her eldest daughter, Salin Supaya, was the Tabindaing Princess (chief queen designate) during the reign of King Mindon.

As the saying goes "Son Kyapin, daughter Salin," children of Limban Mibaya were the favorites of King Mindon.

References

See also 
 Konbaung dynasty
 List of Burmese consorts

Konbaung dynasty
Burmese Buddhists
Queens consort of Konbaung dynasty
1893 deaths